The Men's decathlon competition at the 1956 Summer Olympics in Melbourne, Australia was held at the Melbourne Cricket Ground on November 29–30.

Competition format
The decathlon consists of ten track and field events, with a points system that awards higher scores for better results in each of the ten components. The athletes all compete in one competition with no elimination rounds.

Records
Prior to the competition, the existing World and Olympic records were as follows.

Schedule
All times are local

Overall results
Key

References

External links
Official Olympic Report, la84.org.

Decathlon
1956
Men's events at the 1956 Summer Olympics